Starr may refer to:

People and fictional characters 
 Starr (surname), a list of people and fictional characters
 Starr (given name), a list of people and fictional characters

Places

United States 
 Starr, Ohio, an unincorporated community
 Starr, South Carolina, a town
 Starr County, Texas
 Starr Township, Cloud County, Kansas
 Starr Township, Hocking County, Ohio
 Starr Historic District, Richmond, Indiana
 Mount Starr, a mountain in California

Antarctica 
 Starr Peninsula, Ellsworth Land
 Starr Lake (McMurdo Station), Ross Island
 Starr Nunatak, Victoria Land

Elsewhere 
 Starr Gate, a location in Blackpool, Lancashire, England
 4150 Starr, a minor planet

Buildings 
 Starr House (disambiguation), various houses on the United States National Register of Historic Places
 Starr Mill, Middletown, Connecticut, on the National Register of Historic Places
 Starr Arena, a sports facility in Hamilton, New York, United States

Ships 
 HMS Starr, various Royal Navy ships
 George E. Starr, as steamboat of the Puget Sound Mosquito Fleet
 USS Starr (AKA-67), an attack cargo ship

Firearms 
 Starr carbine, a single-shot United States Army rifle
 Starr revolver, a 19th-century double-action revolver designed by E. T. Starr

Organizations and companies 
 Starr Foundation, providing grants in education and healthcare
 Starr Companies, an insurance company
 Starr Records, a defunct American record label
 STARR Restaurants, an American restaurant company
 Starr Labs, a musical equipment manufacturer

Other uses 
 Starr (law) or starra, an old term for the contract or obligation of a Jew
 Stapled trans-anal rectal resection (STARR), a surgical procedure

See also
 Starr Report, a government report that led to the impeachment of President Bill Clinton in the Lewinsky scandal
 Star (disambiguation)